Jens Edvin A. Skoghøy (born 16 February 1955) is a Norwegian judge.

He hails from Ringvassøya. He graduated as cand.jur. at the University of Oslo in 1976 and took the dr.juris degree at the University of Tromsø in 1990. He subsequently became a professor there, and has also worked as a lawyer. He was appointed Supreme Court Justice in 1998, as one of the youngest ever. He is a member of the Norwegian Academy of Science and Letters. In early 2017 he resigned from the Supreme Court—the third to do so before the retirement age, after Oscar Christian Gundersen and Nina Frisak—to resume his professorship at the University of Tromsø.

References

1955 births
Living people
20th-century Norwegian judges
Norwegian legal scholars
Supreme Court of Norway justices
University of Oslo alumni
University of Tromsø alumni
Academic staff of the University of Tromsø
Members of the Norwegian Academy of Science and Letters
21st-century Norwegian lawyers